Mu-ming Poo (born October 31, 1948) is a Chinese-American neuroscientist. He is the Paul Licht Distinguished Professor Emeritus at the University of California, Berkeley and the Founding Director of the Shanghai-based Institute of Neuroscience (ION) of the Chinese Academy of Sciences. He was awarded the 2016 Gruber Prize in Neuroscience for his pioneering work on synaptic plasticity. At ION, Poo led a team of scientists that produced the world's first truly cloned primates, a pair of crab-eating macaques called Zhongzhong and Huahua in 2017, using somatic cell nuclear transfer (SCNT).

Early life 
Poo was born in Nanjing, Jiangsu, China on October 31, 1948. When he was one, his family moved to Taiwan because of the Chinese Communist Revolution. Influenced by his father, an aeronautical engineer, he was interested in physics from a young age. He attended National Tsing Hua University in Taiwan, graduating with a degree in physics in 1970.

Career in the US
In 1970, he went to the United States to pursue graduate studies at Johns Hopkins University, where he became interested in biophysics. Under the guidance of Richard Cone, he developed the now widely used method to determine the kinetics of diffusion through cells, fluorescence recovery after photobleaching. His research was published in the major journal Nature in 1974. After earning his PhD, he was a postdoctoral researcher at Purdue University, and became an assistant professor at the University of California, Irvine in 1976. He developed a new method to manipulate proteins in cell membranes called "in situ electrophoresis".

In 1985, he moved to the Yale School of Medicine to conduct research in proteins and synapses. Later he became a professor at Columbia University and then at the University of California, San Diego in 1996. During this period he made significant discoveries in molecular neurobiology that developed into a new study area on neurotrophins. Poo and his colleagues also invented a new method called the "growth cone turning assay", now widely in neuroscience for measuring axon growth in reaction to proteins.

He moved to the University of California, Berkeley in 2000, where he later became Paul Licht Distinguished Professor in Biology. At Berkeley, he made many new discoveries in understanding the factors that determine the development of axons and dendrites in neurons. He also made important discoveries in synaptic plasticity, demonstrating that spike-timing-dependent plasticity plays a crucial role in neuron connections.

Career in China
In 1999, Poo co-founded the Shanghai-based Institute of Neuroscience (ION) of the Chinese Academy of Sciences and served as its director. For the following decade, he commuted frequently between Berkeley and Shanghai, until the constant traveling took a toll and he decided to focus on his work in Shanghai. He is now a professor emeritus at UC Berkeley. In 2017, he gave up his American citizenship, which he had acquired in the 1980s, and reinstated his Chinese citizenship.

At ION, Poo led a team of Chinese scientists that produced the world's first truly cloned primates, a pair of crab-eating macaques called Zhong Zhong and Hua Hua in late 2017, using somatic cell nuclear transfer (the technique used to create Dolly the sheep) rather than embryo twinning. According to Poo, the principal significance of this event is that it could be used to create genetically identical monkeys for use in animal experiments.  Crab-eating macaques are already an established model organism for studies of atherosclerosis, though Poo chose to emphasize neuroscience, naming Parkinson's disease and Alzheimer's disease when he appeared on the radio news program All Things Considered in January 2018.

Poo compares his career to a "random walk": "When I bump into an interesting problem, I work on it for as long as I can contribute. Then I move on."

Honors and awards 
Poo is a member of the United States National Academy of Sciences, the Chinese Academy of Sciences, Academia Sinica of Taiwan, and the Hong Kong Academy of Sciences. In 2016, he was awarded the $500,000 Gruber Prize in Neuroscience for his "pioneering and inspiring work on synaptic plasticity".

He is also the recipient of the following awards:
 Fellow of the American Association for the Advancement of Science (AAAS, 2001)
 Ameritec Prize (2001)
 Ray Wu Society Award (2002)
 Honorary Doctoral Degree, École Normale Supérieure, Paris (2003)
 National Prize for International Cooperation, China (2005)
 Qiushi Excellent Scientist Award, China (2010)
 Outstanding Science and Technology Achievement Prize, Chinese Academy of Sciences (2011)
 Honorary Doctoral Degree, Hong Kong University of Science and Technology (2014)

Personal life 
Poo married a fellow Taiwanese immigrant to the US, chemist and oncologist Wen-jen Hwu, and they later divorced. They have two daughters: Ting and Ai-jen. Ai-jen Poo (born 1974) is a social activist and writer who won the MacArthur "Genius" Award in 2014. Ting Poo is a filmmaker who was the editor of Heaven Is a Traffic Jam on the 405, which won the Academy Award for Best Documentary (Short Subject) in 2017.

Poo married again, to Yang Dan, his former student at Columbia University. Dan is also a distinguished neuroscientist who was elected to the US National Academy of Sciences in 2018.

References 

1948 births
Living people
Chinese neuroscientists
American neuroscientists
American people of Chinese descent
National Tsing Hua University alumni
Johns Hopkins University alumni
Purdue University alumni
University of California, Irvine faculty
Columbia University faculty
University of California, San Diego faculty
Yale University faculty
University of California, Berkeley faculty
Foreign members of the Chinese Academy of Sciences
Foreign associates of the National Academy of Sciences
Members of Academia Sinica
Taiwanese emigrants to the United States
Taiwanese people from Jiangsu
Scientists from Nanjing
Former United States citizens
Biologists from Jiangsu
Educators from Nanjing
Chinese Civil War refugees